Stephanie Savage (born 1969) is a Canadian screenwriter and television producer. Savage is best known for developing The CW's teen drama series Gossip Girl (2007) from the novel series, and being an executive producer of the Fox series The O.C.. In 2010 Savage and creative partner Josh Schwartz created Fake Empire Productions, a production company producing their TV series, films and music.

Career
Savage graduated from the University of Toronto in 1990 with a B.A. in English and Cinema Studies, then from the University of Iowa in 1993 with an M.A. in Film History and Theory. While writing her PhD dissertation for the University of Iowa she moved to Los Angeles, and in 1995 was offered a position at Drew Barrymore's production company Flower Films. Here she dabbled in scriptwriting, handling production rewrites for Charlie's Angels, and met the film's director McG. The two later formed production company Wonderland Sound and Vision in 2001.

In September 2016, Savage was announced as an executive producer for the then-upcoming Dynasty reboot series.

Filmography

Film

Television
The numbers in directing and writing credits refer to the number of episodes.

Web
The numbers in writing credits refer to the number of episodes.

See also
 Fake Empire Productions
 Josh Schwartz

References

External links

1969 births
21st-century Canadian screenwriters
Canadian soap opera writers
Canadian television producers
Canadian women television producers
Living people
University of Toronto alumni
University of Iowa alumni
Women soap opera writers
Place of birth missing (living people)
21st-century Canadian women writers
Canadian women screenwriters
Canadian women television writers